Farres is a former municipality in Achaea, West Greece, Greece. Since the 2011 local government reform it is part of the municipality Erymanthos, of which it is a municipal unit. The municipal unit has an area of 241.848 km2. The municipality Farres existed between 1835 and 1912, and again between 1998 and 2011. Its seat of administration was in the town Chalandritsa. Farres is situated in the centre of Achaea, on the upper courses of the rivers Peiros and Parapeiros. Towards the southeast (Mount Erymanthos) and northeast (Panachaiko) the terrain is increasingly mountainous. It is located about 15 km south of Patras and 30 km west of Kalavryta. The Greek National Road 33 (Patras - Tripoli) runs through western Farres.

Subdivisions
The municipal unit Farres is subdivided into the following communities (constituent villages in brackets):
Chalandritsa (Chalandritsa, Kydonies, Mastoraiika-Stamaiika)
Chrysopigi (Chrysopigi, Ano Chrysopigi)
Elliniko (Elliniko, Agia Eleousa, Koumaris, Neochori, Chrysavgi)
Fares (Fares, Prevedos)
Isoma
Kalanistra (Kalanistra, Rodia)
Kalanos village (Kalanos)
Kalousi
Katarraktis
Kritharakia (Kritharakia, Asteri, Toskes)
Lakkomata (Lakkomata, Tsapournia)
Mirali
Neo Kompigadi (Neo Kompigadi, Michas, Platanos)
Platanovrysi (Platanovrysi, Agia Paraskevi, Kato Platanovrysi, Koimisis)
Starochori (Ano Starochori, Dafnoula, Kato Starochori, Trousas)
Vasiliko (Vasiliko, Agrilia, Kydonies, Sterna, Stefani)

Historical population

History

Near Chalandritsa a Mycenaean settlement has been excavated in 1985. Pharae was one of the cities of the Achaean League. After the Roman conquest, it belonged to Patras. During the Frankish rule (13th-14th century) the Barony of Chalandritsa was established. The barony was ruled by the French Dramelay (or Trémolay) family and later the Genoese Zaccaria family. The remains of the Frankish castle have been preserved. Ottoman rule lasted until the Greek War of Independence, in which the area was liberated in 1821-1822. Two earthquakes, measuring 5.5 on the Richter scale, struck the municipality on February 5, 2008 causing little damage.

References

Notes
Chalandritsa (Η Χαλανδρίτσα), Stefanos Thomopoulos, 1937
History Of The Cities Of Patras, Volume I & II (Ιστορία της πόλεως Πατρών , Τόμοι Α΄& Β΄ = Istoria tis poleos Patron, Tomi I & II), Stefanos Thomopoulos, Achaikes Ekdoseis 
Archaies poleis perix tis Olympias (Αρχαίες πόλεις πέριξ της Ολυμπίας = Ancient Cities Beyond Olympia, Vasilis Taktikos, Athanasios Koumartzis, Anadrasi, Athens 2002
O emfylios polems stin Achaia (Ο εμφύλιος πόλεμος στην Αχαία = The Civil War in Achaia), Vasileios Lazaris, Sygchroni Epochi, Athens, 2006

External links

Official website

Populated places in Achaea
Populated places established in 1835